The following lists events that happened during 1959 in Ruanda-Urundi.

Events

November
 November 1 – Violence between the Hutu and Tutsi people was triggered by an attack upon Hutu activist Dominique Mbonyumutwa. Over the next two weeks 300 people, mostly Tutsi, were killed, in what was known as the wind of destruction.

References

 
1950s in Ruanda-Urundi
Years of the 20th century in Ruanda-Urundi
Ruanda-Urundi
Ruanda-Urundi